Liana Janáčková (born 17 December 1953) is a Czech politician, former mayor of the Mariánské Hory a Hulváky district of Ostrava and a senator.

Biography
She studied at the Faculty of Architecture of Brno University of Technology, before working at Stavoprojekt Ostrava and Drupos Ostrava.

Political career
She became Mayor of Mariánské Hory a Hulváky in 1990 and joined the Civic Democratic Party (ODS). She left ODS in 2004. She was replaced by Radomír Michniak in 2006. She returned to the position in 2007.

In 2004, Janáčková was elected to the Senate as a nominee of the Party of Free Citizens. She left the party in 2009. She sought a second term in 2010 election but was defeated by Antonín Maštalíř. She also ran for Senate in 2016 but was defeated by Zdeněk Nytra.

References

1953 births
Svobodní Senators
Civic Democratic Party (Czech Republic) mayors
20th-century Czech women politicians
Civic Forum politicians
Politicians from Ostrava
Living people
21st-century Czech women politicians
Brno University of Technology alumni